Connect is the fourth studio album by Australian band Sick Puppies, released on 16 July 2013 by Capitol Records. This was the last album to feature lead vocalist and guitarist Shimon Moore prior to his dismissal on 20 October 2014.

The album debuted at No. 17 on the US Billboard 200 album chart, their highest charting position to date, with 18,195 copies sold. Connect sold 16,318 albums in its first week.

A preview of the first single "There's No Going Back" was released on YouTube on 10 May 2013. The single was released on 20 May 2013.

Music
Stephen Thomas Erlewine of Allmusic highlighted that "the trio's fourth album, are varied and its themes are ambitious, tackling disconnect and politics", but it "doesn't mean the Australian trio necessarily sounds adult, however."

Critical reception

Connect garnered generally mixed reviews from music critics. Stephen Thomas Erlewine of Allmusic called the album "a richer musical experience than the group's previous records", but wrote that the band was "still hampered a bit by their desperate desire to be taken seriously, but the back half of Connect, written largely on acoustic guitars, shows that their strength is not in attitude but rather in softer sonic textures." At Alternative Press, Reed Fischer felt that "Connect grates far too often to live up to its name."

Track listing

Personnel
Sick Puppies
Shim Moore – lead vocals, guitar
Emma Anzai – bass, vocals, lead vocals on "Under a Very Black Sky"
Mark Goodwin – drums, percussion, backing vocals

Chart performance

References

Sick Puppies albums
2013 albums
Albums produced by Rock Mafia
Capitol Records albums